Zakia Khudadadi also spelt as Zakia Khodadadi (born 29 September 1998) is an Afghan parataekwondo practitioner. She is the first Afghan female taekwondo practitioner. She rose to prominence after winning the African International Parataekwondo Championship in 2016 at the age of 18. She represented Afghanistan at the 2020 Summer Paralympics. She was initially denied the opportunity to compete at her maiden Paralympics due to the Taliban takeover but she was later allowed by the International Paralympic Committee to compete in the event after being safely evacuated from Afghanistan. She was able to compete and became the first Afghan female Paralympic competitor to compete at the Paralympics after 17 years since Mareena Karim's participation at the 2004 Summer Paralympics. She also officially became the first Afghan female sportsperson to participate in an international sporting event after the Taliban takeover.

Biography 
Khudadadi is originally from Herat Province. She has only one functional arm.

Career 
Khudadadi was motivated to take up the sport of taekwondo since Afghanistan's only Olympic medals came in taekwondo in 2008 and 2012. She was inspired by Rohullah Nikpai, who is highly regarded as Afghanistan's first (and currently only) Olympic medalist. After the downfall of the Taliban in 2001 she, like many other women in Afghanistan, was encouraged to compete in sporting events just like men did. However, she had most of her training sessions at home and in her backyard as her opportunities to represent the local clubs were hampered due to the presence of Taliban in her home province of Herat.

She won the 2016 African International Parataekwondo Championship held in Egypt. She received wild card entry to participate in the delayed Tokyo 2020 Summer Paralympics, where she was chosen as one of the two competitors from Afghanistan alongside track athlete Hossain Rasouli. Khudadadi qualified to compete in the women's K44 Under-49 kg event.

She left her parents and travelled to Kabul in order to train in preparation for the Summer Paralympics. However, Afghanistan's participation in the games was imperiled following the Fall of Kabul to the Taliban. Afghan athletes were also unable to leave Kabul due to the closure of the airports. Khudadadi went into hiding from the Taliban and publicly requested immediate help in order to safely leave Afghanistan and take part at the Tokyo Paralympics. She was confirmed to be on the evacuation list of Spain.

On 28 August 2021, Khudadadi, alongside her male compatriot Hossain Rasouli, arrived in Tokyo after being airlifted from Kabul to Paris by the Royal Australian Air Force as part of international evacuation efforts, ending the uncertainties which prevailed regarding Afghanistan's participation at the Tokyo Paralympics. The President of the International Paralympic Committee, Andrew Parsons, announced that both of the Afghan athletes would not be available for interviews and that permission had been granted to them to skip the usual press conferences.

On 2 September 2021, she competed in the round of 16 event at the 2020 Tokyo Paralympics and lost the round to Ziyodakhon Isakova of Uzbekistan. Khudadadi subsequently qualified to the repechage round but lost to Ukraine's Viktoriia Marchuk.

References 

1998 births
Living people
Afghan female taekwondo practitioners
People from Herat Province
Afghan amputees
Paralympic taekwondo practitioners of Afghanistan
Amputee category Paralympic competitors